That Total Age is the debut album of the British EBM group Nitzer Ebb. After its release, it spawned the hit single "Join in the Chant," which hit #9 on the US dance chart in 1987. For unknown reasons, the song "Warsaw Ghetto" was omitted from the original CD versions. The 2018 remastered CD corrects this and adds additional remixes.

The symbols on the cover of the album stand for "Force is Machine", "Visions of Order", and "Muscle and Hate". Two of these phrases can be heard repeated in the song "Join in the Chant".

Track listing

LP: Mute Stumm 45 (UK)|Geffen/Warner Bros. 24155 
 "Fitness to Purpose" – 5:00
 "Warsaw Ghetto" – 3:47
 "Violent Playground" – 3:46
 "Murderous" – 5:40
 "Smear Body" – 5:40
 "Join in the Chant" – 6:05
 "Alarm" – 3:41
 "Let Your Body Learn" – 2:48
 "Let Beauty Loose" – 2:24
 "Into the Large Air" – 4:13

 also released on 2xLP (L STUMM 45)

CD: Mute Stumm 45 (UK)|Geffen/Warner Bros. 24155
 "Fitness to Purpose" – 5:03
 "Violent Playground" – 3:49
 "Murderous" – 5:43
 "Smear Body" – 5:49
 "Join in the Chant" – 6:05
 "Alarm" – 3:41
 "Let Your Body Learn" – 2:48
 "Let Beauty Loose" – 2:24
 "Into the Large Air" – 4:13
 "Join in the Chant" (Metal Mix) – 5:16
 "Fitness to Purpose" (Mix Two) – 4:56
 "Murderous" (Instrumental) – 5:04

References

1987 debut albums
Mute Records albums
Geffen Records albums
Nitzer Ebb albums